The Maine Video Activists Network (MVAN) is a monthly video newsreel produced by activists throughout the state of Maine in the United States.  It is an extension of the Indymedia movement, in which grassroots organizers and average citizens are producing their own media content and distributing it through non-commercial avenues such as the internet, Public-access television, print, and radio.  In the spirit of highly subjective (yet non-commercial and non-corporate) journalism, the Maine Video Activists Network has produced material on a diverse range of topics: discrimination on college campuses, eco-terrorism legislation, anti-war activity, universal healthcare, low-income community organizing and direct action, union organizing, hate crimes, critical mass, disability rights, and student activism.  The program was founded by video activists in Lewiston, Maine, and receives regular contributions from other producers in Biddeford, Freeport, Portland, and Madison.  All of the work behind MVAN is done by unpaid volunteers and the show has been consistently airing on Democracy Player and Maine Public-access television stations since January 2006.

External links 
 Official website

Mass media in Maine
Citizen journalism
Indymedia
American journalism organizations
American news websites
American online journalism
News agencies based in the United States